Aranyadalli Abhimanyu is a 1991 Indian Kannada film, directed by H. R. Bhargava and produced by S P Rajashekar. The film stars Ambareesh, Poonam Dasgupta, Devaraj and Doddanna. The film has a musical score by Laxmikant–Pyarelal.

Cast
Ambareesh
Poonam Dasgupta
Devaraj
Doddanna
Jaggesh
Syed
Rajanand
Ramesh Bhat
Mysore Lokesh
Sihikahi Chandru
Tennis Krishna
Shani Mahadevappa
Anjali Sudhakar
Kamalashree

Soundtrack

References

External links

1991 films
1990s Kannada-language films
Films scored by Laxmikant–Pyarelal
Films directed by H. R. Bhargava